Fly Away Home is a 2016 Austrian drama film directed by Miriam Unger based on the biographical novel by Christine Nöstlinger.

Plot
In Vienna during the end of the Second World War, the house of the Nöstlingers in Hernals is hit during air raids and is badly damaged. The mother of eight-year-old Christine therefore accepts the offer of Mrs. von Braun, the widow of a National Socialist, to move with her two daughters to a villa in Neuwaldegg, while the grandparents stay in the bombed apartment.

Christina's father as a soldier of the Wehrmacht is heavily wounded in his legs. He deserts from the hospital with shrapnel fragments in his leg, and returns to his family. As a deserter he has to hide from both German and Russian soldiers. After the capitulation of the Wehrmacht, Russian crew members quarter themselves in the villa. While most are afraid of the soldiers with their unpredictable nature and their constant drunkenness, Christine befriends the Russian field cook Cohn. Cohn brings Christine to her grandparents in a horse-drawn cart, and promises to pick her up soon to bring her back to the mansion, but he does not show up anymore. Instead, she is picked up by her father as Cohn was arrested because he is considered a deserter. After the departure of the Russians, the Nöstlingers move out of the villa.

Cast
 Zita Gaier - Christine
 Ursula Strauss - Mother
 Gerald Votava - Father
 Konstantin Khabensky - Cohn
 Paula Brunner - Sister
 Krista Stadler - Grandmother
 Heinz Marecek - Grandfather
 Bettina Mittendorfer - Mrs. von Braun
 Denis Burgazliev - Major
 Ivan Shvedoff - Sergeant
 Lissy Pernthaler - Soldier Ludmilla
 Hilde Dalik - Archangel
 Alexander Jagsch - Forstrat

Production
The shooting took place from June to August 2015 in Vienna, Lower Austria and South Tyrol.

Konstantin Khabensky had to learn his lines phonetically for his German speaking role as he did not know the language.

References

External links

2016 war drama films
Austrian war drama films
Films based on Austrian novels
Austrian World War II films
Films set in 1945
Films set in country houses
Films set in Vienna
Films shot in Vienna
2010s German-language films